Rearcross or Rear Cross is a village in the townland of Reardnogy in County Tipperary, Ireland. It is located on the R503 Thurles to Limerick Regional Road, in the Slieve Felim Mountains. It is in the Roman Catholic parish of Kilcommon and Hollyford and Rearcross, in the Archdiocese of Cashel and Emly, and also in the historical barony of Owney and Arra.

Rearcross Church
Rearcross Church was designed by a Swiss architect for a Wesleyan congregation. It was a temporary structure situated in Northumbria and used by the mining community there.   During the 1880s the community at Rearcross had to walk quite a distance to hear mass in the absence of a local church.  At the time, diocesan funds were heavily committed to finishing the cathedral in Thurles and with resources stretched the bishop dispatched the local priests on fund-raising drives to America.  The parish priest in Rearcross, Fr. William J. McKeogh, on one such expedition succeeded in raising the sum of £4,400 in America while other priests returned with less.
  
In the meantime, Fr. McKeogh somehow heard of the church in Northumbria, where the mining industry was going into decline.  In 1887 he arranged to buy the church for £440, had it dismantled, imported to Limerick and transported by the local farmers of Rearcross to its present location.  The site was donated by the Hogan family. The steps were built at the expense of the landlord, Lord Barrington, by his workmen from Glenstal Abbey.  The church is unique, having corrugated tin walls (the iron having been used during the Second World War) and roof, three galleries, a stained glass rose window in each gable and representations of two saints not usually the objects of Irish devotion - St. Thomas Aquinas and St. William. The names coincide with the first names of the priest donors.  The church was renovated at the cost of €90,000 .

People
 Austin Flannery, priest

External links
 Rearcross Church - Buildings of Ireland

See also
 Other tin churches in Ireland
 List of towns and villages in Ireland

References

Owney and Arra
Towns and villages in County Tipperary